Henri Baumann (born 15 August 1927, date of death unknown) was a Swiss basketball player. He competed in the men's tournament at the 1948 Summer Olympics and the 1952 Summer Olympics.

References

External links
 

1927 births
Year of death missing
Swiss men's basketball players
Olympic basketball players of Switzerland
Basketball players at the 1948 Summer Olympics
Basketball players at the 1952 Summer Olympics
Place of birth missing